is a Japanese manga series written by Oji Hiroi and illustrated by Yūsuke Kozaki. The series follows the detective of the same name as she faces supernatural cases. It was originally serialized by Gentosha in the magazines BStreet and Monthly Comic Birz from 2002 to 2012. The series was collected into ten volumes and was published in several countries. In 2013, an English-language motion comic adaptation was produced and released online.

Plot
Karasuma Kyoko no Jikenbo is set in Asakusa, Tokyo in the year of 2050, in which the creatures of Oni—ogres of Japanese mythology. Once worshiped by people, these creatures were relegated to live in the margin of society. However, as they get tired of such life they start to live among humans, becoming influential economic and political leaders. With power and anger accumulated the monsters—united under the OOO (Organization of Ogrecide)—decide to break a millennial pact signed with the men, and declare war on them.

The main character of the series is the 16-year-old detective of the same name, who has supernatural powers, including superhuman speed.

Release
Written by Oji Hiroi and illustrated by Yūsuke Kozaki, Karasuma Kyoko no Jikenbo was first published as part of Gentosha's BStreet manga anthology in 2002. It was then serialized in Gentosha's Monthly Comic Birz seinen magazine from 2003 to February 29, 2012. Gentosha compiled all individual chapters and published into ten tankōbon volumes from September 24, 2003 to March 30, 2012.

Outside Japan, the serie was also published in Czech Republic by Zoner Press, France by Taifu Comics, in Germany by Carlsen Comics, in Italy by Ronin Manga, in Indonesia by Elex Media, in Russia by Comix-ART, and in Taiwan by Ever Glory Publishing.

Volume list

Motion comic
In February 2013, Karasuma Kyoko no Jikenbo was adapted by Happinet and the Inception Media Group into a "Manga 2.5"—a motion comic with English voice acting, sound effects, animation, motion, and coloring. Along with The Mythical Detective Loki, it was the first Manga 2.5, which were released to the iTunes Store in the United States, Canada, the United Kingdom, Australia, New Zealand, Hong Kong, and South Africa. Directed by Keiji Korogi and produced by Haruo Kawashima, the series was released into 8 chapters for a total of 86 minutes. Crunchyroll announced they would make the motion comic available on its streaming site in May 2014.

Cast
Alexa Kahn as Kyoko Karasuma
Nate Joyner as Raymond Kumano
Larry Butler as Kozo Mitamura
Bryan Forrest as Kirio Uchida
Caleb Pearson as Shoichi Ise
David Gerrold as Vice chief Kunimitsu

Episode list

References

External links

Fiction set in 2050
Detective anime and manga
Gentosha manga
Science fiction anime and manga
Seinen manga
Supernatural anime and manga